The Adversary may refer to:

 "The Adversary" (Star Trek: Deep Space Nine), a 1995 episode of Star Trek: Deep Space Nine
 The Adversary (Ihsahn album), the debut solo album of Emperor frontman Ihsahn
 The Adversary (Thy Art Is Murder album), the debut album by deathcore band Thy Art Is Murder
 The Adversary (Fables)
 The Adversary (Carrère book), a French non-fiction book on the murders perpetuated by Jean-Claude Romand written by Emmanuel Carrère
 The Adversary (film), a 2002 French drama film directed by Nicole Garcia based on Emmanuel Carrère's book of the same name
 Pratidwandi, known internationally as The Adversary, a 1970 Indian Bengali film directed by Satyajit Ray
 The Adversary, book four in "The Saga of the Exiles" by Julian May
 The Adversary,  the original name for Satan, an evil figure appearing in the texts of the Abrahamic religions
 The Adversary (Westworld), an episode of the HBO series Westworld

See also
 Adversary (disambiguation)